This is a list of formations in the United States Army during World War I.  Many of these formations still exist today, though many by different designations.

Field armies
First United States Army
Second United States Army
Third United States Army

Army corps

Ambulance corps

Motor transport Corps 
 The Motor Transport Corps of the United States Army during World War 1

Army corps
I Corps
II Corps
III Corps
IV Corps
V Corps
VI Corps
VII Corps
VIII Corps
IX Corps

Coast artillery corps
United States Army Coast Artillery Corps - provided almost all US-manned heavy and railway artillery units

Tank corps 
 United States Tank Corps

Signal corps
 United States Army Signal Corps
 Aviation Section, U.S. Signal Corps
 List of American Aero Squadrons
 List of American Balloon Squadrons

Divisions

Cavalry divisions
15th Cavalry Division

Infantry divisions
1st Division ("The Big Red One")
2nd Division ("Indian Head Division")
3rd Division ("Rock of the Marne")
4th Division ("Ivy Division")
5th Division ("Red Diamond")
6th Division ("Sight-Seeing Sixth")
7th Division ("Hourglass Division")
8th Division ("Golden Arrow Division"; "Pathfinder Division")
9th Division ("Varsity")
10th Division
11th Division ("Lafayette Division")
12th Division ("Plymouth Division")
13th Division ("Lucky 13th")
14th Division ("Wolverine Division")
15th Division
16th Division
17th Division
18th Division ("Cactus Division")
19th Division
20th Division
26th Division ("Yankee Division")
27th Division ("New York Division" and "Orion Division")
28th Division ("Keystone Division")
29th Division ("Blue and Grey Division")
30th Division ("Old Hickory Division")
31st Division ("Dixie Division")
32nd Division ("Les Terribles"; "Red Arrow Division")
33rd Division ("Prairie Division")
34th Division ("Red Bull Division")
35th Division ("Santa Fe Division")
36th Division ("Texas Division")
37th Division ("Buckeye Division")
38th Division ("Cyclone Division")
39th Division ("Delta Division")
40th Division ("Sunshine Division")
41st Division ("Sunset Division")
42nd Division ("Rainbow Division")
76th Division ("Liberty Bell Division"; "Onaway Division")
77th Division ("Statue of Liberty Division")
78th Division ("Lightning Division")
79th Division ("Cross of Lorraine Division")
80th Division ("Blue Ridge Division")
81st Division ("Wildcat Division")
82nd Division ("All-American Division")
83rd Division ("Ohio Division")
84th Division ("Railsplitters")
85th Division ("Custer Division")
86th Division ("Blackhawk Division")
87th Division ("Golden Acorn Division")
88th Division ("Fighting Blue Devils"; "Clover Leaf Division")
89th Division ("Rolling W")
90th Division ("Tough 'Ombres")
91st Division ("Pine Tree Division"; "Wild West Division")
92nd Division (Colored) ("Buffalo Soldiers")
93rd Division (Colored) ("Blue Helmets") (only infantry organized)
94th Division (Puerto Rico) (only infantry organized)
95th Division (not fully organized)
96th Division (not fully organized)
97th Division (not fully organized)
98th Division (only HQ organized)
99th Division (only HQ organized)
100th Division (only HQ organized)
101st Division (only HQ organized)
102nd Division (only cadre organized)

Brigades

Cavalry brigades

Infantry brigades

Field artillery brigades

Artillery brigades (Coast Artillery Corps)

Depot brigades 
151st Depot Brigade
152nd Depot Brigade
153rd Depot Brigade
154th Depot Brigade
155th Depot Brigade
156th Depot Brigade
157th Depot Brigade
158th Depot Brigade
159th Depot Brigade
160th Depot Brigade
161st Depot Brigade
162nd Depot Brigade
163rd Depot Brigade
164th Depot Brigade
165th Depot Brigade
166th Depot Brigade
167th Depot Brigade

References

United States Army World War I
World War I
  
World War I